Jerry Wemple (Arthur Gerard Wemple) is an American poet.

Wemple was born in 1960 in Dunmore, Pennsylvania. He grew up mainly in the central Susquehanna Valley of Pennsylvania and graduated from Shikellamy High School in Sunbury in 1978.  He spent part of his youth in southwest Florida, served in the US Navy, and holds degrees from Vermont College and the University of Massachusetts Amherst.

Wemple is the author of two collections of poetry. His first collection, You Can See It from Here, (Lotus Press, 1999) won the Naomi Long Madgett Poetry Award. (Pulitzer Prize–winning poet Yusef Kumanyakaa was the judge.) His second collection is The Civil War in Baltimore, which earned him a nomination for a Pushcart Prize. His third collection, Artemas & Ark: the Ridge and Valley poems was published in 2020 by Finishing Line Press. He has also published two poetry chapbooks.

Wemple is also co-editor of Common Wealth: Contemporary Poets on Pennsylvania, published in 2005 by Penn State Press. Wemple has also contributed essays, reviews, and poetry to many journals. He currently teaches at Bloomsburg University of Pennsylvania.

References

 Naomi Long Madgett award winners
 Pushcart prize nomination
 Review of Common Wealth
 Bloomsburg University staff list, September 2007

External links
 Wemple's website

1960 births
Living people
People from Dunmore, Pennsylvania
American male poets
21st-century American poets
21st-century American male writers